Ramezhki is a rural locality (a village) in Kovarditskoye Rural Settlement, Muromsky District, Vladimir Oblast, Russia. The population was 34 as of 2010.

Geography 
Ramezhki is located on the Ilevna River, 16 km northwest of Murom (the district's administrative centre) by road. Pestenkino is the nearest rural locality.

References 

Rural localities in Muromsky District